Scott Eric Neustadter (born 1977) is an American screenwriter and producer. He often works with his writing partner, Michael H. Weber. The two writers are best known for writing the screenplay for the romantic comedy film 500 Days of Summer. The film is based on two real relationships Neustadter had. They also wrote the screenplays for the film adaptations of the novels The Spectacular Now, The Fault in Our Stars, and Paper Towns.

For writing The Disaster Artist, Neustadter and Weber were nominated for an Academy Award for Best Adapted Screenplay. They also created the television series Friends with Benefits, which lasted one season.

Life and career
Neustadter was born and raised in a Jewish family in Margate City, New Jersey, the son of Anne (Goldberg) and Michael J. Neustadter. He attended Atlantic City High School, University of Pennsylvania and graduate studies at The London School of Economics and The University of Southern California.

At age 25, Neustadter moved to study in Los Angeles, California, and shortly thereafter moved to Santa Monica, where he currently resides.

Neustadter and Weber wrote the script for The Disaster Artist (2017), the adaptation of the book of the same name. They also wrote Our Souls at Night, an adaptation of Kent Haruf's final novel of the same name, for Netflix, with Robert Redford and Jane Fonda playing the lead roles, the first movie they have made together since 1979's The Electric Horseman.

They will adapt another John Green novel, Looking for Alaska. They also are adapting The Rosie Project.

Neustadter has been married to Lauren Rachelle Levy since October 9, 2010. The couple has one son and one daughter.

Filmography

Films
500 Days of Summer (2009)
The Pink Panther 2 (2009)
The Spectacular Now (2013) (also executive producer)
The Fault in Our Stars (2014)
Paper Towns (2015) (also executive producer)
The Disaster Artist (2017) (also executive producer)
Our Souls at Night (2017)
Rosaline (2022)

Television
Friends with Benefits (2011) (also executive producer)
Daisy Jones & The Six (2023) (also executive producer)

Awards

(500) Days of Summer
Critics' Choice Movie Awards for Best Screenplay (Nominated) 
Utah Film Critics Association for Best Screenplay (Nominated) 
Washington D.C. Area Film Critics Association for Best Screenplay (Nominated) 
Hollywood Film Festival Award for Breakthrough Screenwriter
Independent Spirit Award for Best Screenplay
Las Vegas Film Critics Society for Best Screenplay
Oklahoma Film Critics Circle for Best Screenplay - Original
Satellite Award for Best Original Screenplay
Southeastern Film Critics Association for Best Original Screenplay
St. Louis Gateway Film Critics Association for Best Screenplay
Writers Guild of America Award for Best Original Screenplay (Nominated)

The Spectacular Now
Alliance of Women Film Journalists for Best Adapted Screenplay (Nominated) 
Independent Spirit Awards for Best Screenplay (Nominated)
Indiana Film Critics Association for Best Screenplay (Nominated)
San Francisco Film Critics Circle for Best Adapted Screenplay (Nominated) 
St. Louis Gateway Film Critics Association for Best Adapted Screenplay (Nominated)
Washington D.C. Area Film Critics Association for Best Adapted Screenplay (Nominated)

The Disaster Artist
Academy Award for Best Adapted Screenplay (Nominated)
Writers Guild of America Award for Best Adapted Screenplay (Nominated)

References

External links
 
 
 Interview Michael Weber and Scott Neustadter on 500 Days of Summer
 Jewish Times of South Jersey: Wedding Announcement

1977 births
Living people
Alumni of the London School of Economics
Atlantic City High School alumni
American male screenwriters
Jewish American writers
People from Margate City, New Jersey
University of Pennsylvania alumni
Writers from Santa Monica, California
Screenwriters from California
Screenwriters from New Jersey
21st-century American Jews